The 2008–09 Netball Superleague season (known for sponsorship reasons as the Co-operative Netball Superleague) was the fourth season of the Netball Superleague. The league was won by Team Bath. For a third season out of four, Team Bath defeated Galleria Mavericks in the grand final. The Superleague expanded to nine teams, with the addition of Glasgow Wildcats, the first team from Scotland. Team Bath finished the regular season with a 100% record.

Teams 
The Superleague expanded to nine teams, with the addition of Glasgow Wildcats.

Regular season
Team Bath finished the regular season with a 100% record.

Final table

Playoffs
The play-offs utilised the Page–McIntyre system to determine the two grand finalists. This saw the top two from the regular season, Team Bath and Loughborough Lightning, play each other, with the winner going straight through to the grand final. The loser gets a second chance to reach the grand final via the minor final. The third and fourth placed teams, Galleria Mavericks and Leeds Carnegie also play each other, and the winner advances to the minor final. The winner of the minor final qualifies for the grand final.

Minor semi-final

Major semi-final

Minor final

Grand Final

References

 
2008-09
 
 
2009 in Welsh women's sport
2008 in Welsh women's sport
2009 in Scottish women's sport
2008 in Scottish women's sport